Wilderness Heart is the third studio album by Black Mountain, released on September 14, 2010.

The album received a nod from Exclaim! magazine as the No. 18 Pop & Rock Album of 2010. The album was also named as a longlisted nominee for the 2011 Polaris Music Prize.

Usage in media
The single "Let Spirits Ride", was featured on the soundtrack of the game Saints Row: The Third.

Track listing
All songs written by Stephen McBean.
 "The Hair Song" - 3:54
 "Old Fangs" - 4:01
 "Radiant Hearts" - 3:52
 "Rollercoaster" - 5:15
 "Let Spirits Ride" - 4:20
 "Buried by the Blues" - 4:02
 "The Way to Gone" - 4:03
 "Wilderness Heart" - 3:58
 "The Space of Your Mind" - 4:14
 "Sadie" - 5:10

Charts

References

2010 albums
Black Mountain (band) albums
Jagjaguwar albums
Outside Music albums